Doran L. Isackson (March 26, 1938 – September 28, 1989) was a Republican politician from Minnesota and a Minnesota State Senator.  Elected in 1982, Isackson served one term from 1983 to 1987.  He was unseated by Democrat Jim Vickerman in the wave of DFL victories that swept southwestern Minnesota in the DFL "Firestorm" of 1986.

From the town of Storden, Isackson represented the old District 28 (most of which is in the current District 22), which included all or portions of Brown, Cottonwood, Jackson, Martin, Murray, Nobles, Redwood and Watonwan counties.  A farmer by profession, Isackson grew up in Douglas County, graduated from Alexandria High School in 1956, and was a 1960 graduate of the University of Minnesota with a degree in agricultural education.  While at the university, he was a member of the Department of Animal Science's 1958 Poultry Judging Team.

Isackson's legislative concerns in office included agriculture, business climate, jobs, the economy, workers' compensation, education and transportation.  He served on the Minnesota Senate's Agriculture & Natural Resources, Local & Urban Government, Public Utilities & State Regulated Industries, and Veterans & General Legislation committees, and on various subcommittees relevant to each.

Isackson died unexpectedly at his home in Storden on September 28, 1989.

Election results: 1982-1986

References

External links

1938 births
1989 deaths
People from Cottonwood County, Minnesota
People from Alexandria, Minnesota
University of Minnesota College of Food, Agricultural and Natural Resource Sciences alumni
American Lutherans
Republican Party Minnesota state senators
20th-century American politicians
20th-century Lutherans